Leander Paes and Nenad Zimonjić were the defending champions, but they chose not to participate together.
Paes partnered up with Martin Damm, but they were eliminated by Mahesh Bhupathi and Radek Štěpánek in the second round.
Zimonjić played alongside Fabrice Santoro and reached the final, where they lost to Jonas Björkman and Max Mirnyi.

Seeds
All seeds received a bye into the second round.

Draw

Finals

Top half

Bottom half

References
 Doubles Draw

Monte Carlo Masters - Doubles
Doubles